The 26th Annual TV Week Logie Awards was held on Friday 6 April 1984 at the Hilton Hotel in Melbourne, and broadcast on the Nine Network. The ceremony was hosted by Bert Newton. Guests included Christopher Atkins, Heather Thomas, Tony Randall, Dwight Schultz, Douglas Barr, Gerald McRaney, Rich Little, Bob Hawke, Dame Edna Everage, Pamela Stephenson and John Bertrand.

National Awards

Gold Logie
Most Popular Personality on Australian Television
Winner:
Bert Newton in The Don Lane Show (Nine Network)

Acting/Presenting

Most Popular Actor
Winner:
Grant Dodwell in A Country Practice (Seven Network)

Most Popular Actress
Winner:
Rowena Wallace in Sons and Daughters (Seven Network)

Most Popular New Talent
Winner:
James Reyne in Return to Eden (Network Ten)

Best Lead Actor
Winner:
John Stanton in The Dismissal (Network Ten)

Best Lead Actress
Winner:
Sigrid Thornton in All the Rivers Run (Seven Network)

Best Supporting Actor
Winner:
John Meillon in The Dismissal (Network Ten)

Best Supporting Actress
Winner:
Wendy Hughes in Return to Eden (Network Ten)

Best Lead Actor in a Series
Winner:
Kevin Miles in Carson's Law (Network Ten)

Best Lead Actress in a Series
Rowena Wallace in Sons and Daughters (Seven Network)

Best Supporting Actor in a Series
Winner:
Noel Trevarthen in Carson's Law (Network Ten )

Best Supporting Actress in a Series
Winner:
Lorrae Desmond in A Country Practice (Seven Network)

Best Juvenile Performance
Winner:
Darius Perkins in All the Rivers Run (Seven Network)

TV Reporter of the Year
Winner:
Richard Carleton in 60 Minutes (Nine Network)

Most Popular Programs

Most Popular Drama Series
Winner:
A Country Practice (Seven Network)

Most Popular Comedy Show
Winner:
Paul Hogan Show (Nine Network)

Most Popular Variety Show
Winner:
The Mike Walsh Show (Nine Network)

Most Popular Quiz/Game Show
Winner:
Sale of the Century (Nine Network)

Most Popular Public Affairs Show
Winner:
60 Minutes (Nine Network)

Most Popular Documentary Series
Winner:
Willesee documentaries (Seven Network)

Best Programs

Best Miniseries/Telemovie
Winner:
The Dismissal (Network Ten)

Best Special Events Telecast
Winner:
Australia's Variety Spectacular (Nine Network)

Best News Report
Winner:
"Ash Wednesday coverage"

Best Documentary/Documentary Series
Winner:
Ash Wednesday

Best Sports Coverage
Winner:
Cricket (Nine Network)

Outstanding Contribution by a Regional Station
Winner:
Australia Naturally (Television New England, Tamworth)

State Awards

New South Wales
Most Popular Male
Winner:
Mike Walsh

Most Popular Female
Winner:
Penny Cook

Most Popular Show
Winner:
A Country Practice (Seven Network)

Queensland
Most Popular Male
Winner:
Glenn Taylor

Most Popular Female
Winner:
Jacki MacDonald

Most Popular Show
Winner:
State Affair (Seven Network)

South Australia
Most Popular Male
Winner:
Rob Kelvin

Most Popular Female
Winner:
Jane Reilly

Most Popular Show
Winner:
State Affair (Seven Network)

Tasmania
Most Popular Male
Winner:
Bert Taylor

Most Popular Female
Winner:
Jenny Roberts

Most Popular Show
Winner:
Taylor's Tasmania

Victoria
Most Popular Male
Winner:
Daryl Somers

Most Popular Female
Winner:
Paula Duncan

Most Popular Show
Winner:
Carson's Law (Network Ten)

Western Australia
Most Popular Male
Winner:
Russell Goodrick

Most Popular Female
Winner:
Jenny Dunstan

Most Popular Show
Winner:
Channel Nine News (Nine Network)

Hall of Fame
After years in the Australian television industry, Hector Crawford became the first inductee into the TV Week Logies Hall of Fame.

References

External links
 

1984 television awards
1984
1984 in Australian television